Hal Becker (born 1954) is an American author and nationally known expert on the subjects of sales, customer service, and negotiating. He conducts seminars or consults to more than 140 organizations a year, including, IBM, Disney, New York Life, United Airlines, Verizon, Terminix, AT&T, Pearle Vision and Cintas.  His best known books are Can I Have 5 Minutes Of Your Time?, "Lip Service and Hal Becker's Ultimate Sales Book, A Revolutionary Training Manual Guaranteed to Improve Your Skills and Inflate Your Net Worth.

Education
Becker graduated from Cleveland Heights High School in 1972.  In 1993, he was inducted into the Heights Hall of Fame (HHF) with ten other former graduates. 

Working his way through John Carroll University, Becker earned a bachelor's degree in sociology in 1976.  At John Carroll, Becker worked as the Union Director of Special Events booking concerts on campus.

Career
In 1977 at the age of 22, Becker was named the #1 salesperson among a national sales force of 11,000 at Xerox Corporation. In 1983, he launched one of America's first customer service telemarketing firms called Direct Opinions. That same year he was diagnosed and survived terminal cancer. In 1990 he sold Direct Opinions to devote time for consulting and presenting lectures around the world. 

Becker is a syndicated writer in 46 business journal newspapers nationwide.

He is past Chairman of the Solon Chamber of Commerce, and has also served on boards including, Better Business Bureau , March of Dimes, COSE, University of Akron Business School, Cleveland Health Museum/Natural History Museum, Healthy Cities Ohio, Sales & Marketing Executives and Montefiore Nursing Home. Currently, Becker serves as the Chair of the Board of Directors for Better Business Serving Greater Cleveland.

Publications 
Can I Have 5 Minutes Of Your Time?: A No Nonsense Fun Approach to Sales by Hal Becker and Florence Mustric (1993)
At Your Service: Calamities, Catastrophes, and Other Curiosities of Customer Service by Hal B. Becker (1998)
Lip Service: 50 Humorous Stories of the Worst Customer Service in America and Interviews with the 10 Best Companies in the World by Hal B. Becker (2001)
Get What You Want!! A Fun, Upbeat and Fresh Approach to Negotiating by Hal B. Becker, Jon Lief, and Florence Mustric (2004)
Hal Becker's Ultimate Sales Book, A Revolutionary Training Manual Guaranteed to Improve Your Skills and Inflate Your Net Worth by Hal B. Becker (2012)

Awards and honors 

 1977 #1 salesperson among a national sales force of 11,000 at Xerox 
 1994 Heights High School Hall of Fame (HHF) inductee 
 2000 Toastmasters International Communication and Leadership Award 
 2002 National Speakers Association CSP Award
 2004 The Distinguished Marketing and Sales Awards (DMSA)

References

External links
 Hal Becker's official website
 Cleveland Jewish News columns
 Hal Becker on Muck Rack
 Hal Becker on LinkedIn
 Hal Becker on YouTube

John Carroll University alumni
1954 births
Living people
20th-century American businesspeople
Cleveland Heights High School alumni
People from Cleveland Heights, Ohio